Henri Demiéville (1888 – 23 November 1956) was a Swiss breaststroke swimmer. He competed in the men's 400 metre breaststroke event at the 1920 Summer Olympics and the water polo at the 1920 and 1924 Summer Olympics.

References

External links
 

1888 births
1956 deaths
Swiss male water polo players
Olympic swimmers of Switzerland
Olympic water polo players of Switzerland
Swimmers at the 1920 Summer Olympics
Water polo players at the 1920 Summer Olympics
Water polo players at the 1924 Summer Olympics
Place of birth missing
Swiss male breaststroke swimmers